The Green Hill Site is a prehistoric archaeological site in Canton, Massachusetts. This area has been repeatedly excavated since the 1960s. The site encompasses a Middle to Late Archaic period encampment, where Neville style projectile points, gouges for woodworking, and a stone-working worksite have been found.

The site was added to the National Register of Historic Places in 1980.

See also
National Register of Historic Places listings in Norfolk County, Massachusetts

References

National Register of Historic Places in Norfolk County, Massachusetts
Geography of Norfolk County, Massachusetts
Canton, Massachusetts